Roman Jebavý and Zdeněk Kolář were the defending champions but only Kolář chose to defend his title, partnering Aldin Šetkić. Kolář lost in the first round to Nikola Čačić and Luca Margaroli.

Denys Molchanov and Igor Zelenay won the title after defeating Andrej Martin and Daniel Muñoz de la Nava 3–6, 6–3, [11–9] in the final.

Seeds

Draw

References
 Main Draw

Internazionali di Tennis del Friuli Venezia Giulia - Doubles
2018 Doubles
Friuli